In Search Of... may refer to:
 In Search of... (TV series), an American documentary television series, on air 1977–1982, revived in 2002 and 2018.
 In Search of... (N.E.R.D album), a 2001 album by the band N.E.R.D.
 In Search Of... (Fu Manchu album), a 1996 album by the band Fu Manchu
 In Search Of (film), a 2008 drama film

See also